(  or  in the traditional English pronunciation of Latin; Latin for "right to war") "refers to the conditions under which States may resort to war or to the use of armed force in general." This is distinct from the set of rules that ought to be followed during a war, known as jus in bello, which govern the behavior of parties in an armed conflict.<ref>{{cite web|title="Can jus ad bellum override jus in bello?"|url=https://international-review.icrc.org/articles/can-jus-ad-bellum-override-jus-bello-reaffirming-separation-two-bodies-law|publisher=International Committee of the Red Cross |date=23 Jan 2015 |access-date=8 March 2023}}</ref>  

Definition is sometimes considered a part of the laws of war, but the term "laws of war" is more often considered to refer only to jus in bello, which, as noted above, concerns whether a war is conducted justly, or lawfully (regardless of whether the initiation of hostilities was just). Jus ad bellum rules focus on the criteria concerning what conditions make an armed conflict just, or lawful." 

Under modern public international law, the UN Charter establishes the fundamental rules of the jus ad bellum. Article 2, paragraph 4 of the Charter states: "All Members shall refrain in their international relations from the threat or use of force against the territorial integrity or political independence of any State, or in any other manner inconsistent with the purposes of the United Nations." 

Article 51 of the UN Charter later clarifies: "Nothing in the present Charter shall impair the inherent right of individual or collective self-defense if an armed attack occurs against a Member of the United Nations.

An international agreement limiting the justifiable reasons for a country to declare war against another is concerned with jus ad bellum. In addition to bilateral non-aggression pacts, the twentieth century saw multilateral treaties defining entirely new restrictions against going to war. The three most notable examples are the Kellogg-Briand Pact outlawing war as an instrument of national policy, the London Charter (known also as the Nuremberg Charter) defining "crimes against peace" as one of three major categories of international crime to be prosecuted after World War II, and the United Nations Charter, chapter VI of which binds nations to seek resolution of disputes by peaceful means and requires authorization by the United Nations before a nation may initiate any use of force against another, beyond the inherent right of self-defense against an armed attack.

By contrast, agreements defining limits on acceptable conduct while already engaged in war are considered "rules of war" and are referred to as the jus in bello. Thus, the Geneva Conventions are a set of "jus in bello". Doctrines concerning the protection of civilians in wartime, or the need for "proportionality" when force is used, are addressed to issues of conduct within a war, but the same doctrines can also shed light on the question of when it is lawful (or unlawful) to go to war in the first place.

Principles

Proper authority and public declaration
The principle of right authority suggests that a war is just only if waged by a legitimate authority. Such authority is rooted in the notion of state sovereignty.  In his Summa Theologica St. Thomas Aquinas notes that to be a just war, war has not only to be declared publicly, but also must be declared by the proper authority.

Proper authority is what differentiates war from murder: "It is the rules of warfare that give the practice meaning, that distinguish war from murder and soldiers from criminals". A soldier is treated as a prisoner of war and not a criminal because they are operating under the proper authority of the state and cannot be held individually responsible for actions committed under the orders of their military leadership.

Just cause
According to the principle of right intention, the aim of war must not be to pursue narrowly defined national interests, but rather to re-establish a just peace. This state of peace should be preferable to the conditions that would have prevailed had the war not occurred.  Wars cannot be fought simply to annex property or install a regime change.  Current doctrines of "anticipatory self-defense" or preemptive strikes, sometimes associated with the Bush Doctrine, have challenged concepts of right intention/just cause. Right cause includes humanitarian intervention, particularly when actions "shock the conscience".  The responsibility to protect covers more in depth the nature of humanitarian intervention.
Probability of success
According to this principle, there must be good grounds for concluding that aims of the just war are achievable. This principle emphasizes that mass violence must not be undertaken if it is unlikely to secure the just cause.  This criterion is to avoid invasion for invasion's sake and links to the proportionality criteria.  One cannot invade if there is no chance of actually winning.  However, wars are fought with imperfect knowledge, so one must simply be able to make a logical case that one can win; there is no way to know this in advance. These criteria move the conversation from moral and theoretical grounds to practical grounds. Essentially, this is meant to gather coalition building and win approval of other state actors.

Last resort
The principle of last resort stipulates that all non-violent options must first be exhausted before the use of force can be justified.  Diplomatic options, sanctions, and other non-military methods must be attempted or validly ruled out before the engagement of hostilities.  Further, in regard to the amount of harm—proportionally—the principle of last resort would support using small intervention forces first and then escalating rather than starting a war with  massive force such as carpet bombing or nuclear warfare.

History
St. Thomas Aquinas is one of the earliest philosophers on what makes a just war.  His list of criteria were intended to protect civilians and guarantee that wars were not just fought for the interest of private parties.

After the Peace of Westphalia, which ended the Thirty Years' War, scholars became concerned with finding a way to control interstate war while respecting state sovereignty. It wasn’t until the formation of the United Nations after World War II that notions of jus ad bellum were formalized.

The modern era
Since the 1950s, declarations of jus ad bellum have dropped dramatically.   In "Why States No Longer Declare War" Tanisha Fazal notes the drop in formal declarations of war since the 1950s.  This may be as a result of the nuance of war in modern times, given the rise of non-state actors such as terrorist groups.

 See also 
 Casus belli Just war theory
 List of Latin phrases
 Tyrannicide

References

Further reading

External links
 War & Law
 Crimes of War
 Characteristics Of Intractable Conflicts
 Internet Encyclopedia of Philosophy
 Rutgers: Book/Reading List
 Essay hosted at USAF site
 Joseph R. Cerami, James F. Holcomb (Editors). U.S. Army War College guide to strategy. Strategic Studies Institute, 2001. ., pp. 19–30. Chapter 3. Ethical issues in War, An overview'', Cook, Martin L.
 Stanford encyclopedia entry for war
 Brander, Kenneth Rabbi. "Is All Fair in Love & War?" Just & Unjust Wars through the prism of Jewish and Secular Thought", part 1 and part 2

Just war theory
Latin legal terminology